The 2018 Tallahassee Tennis Challenger was a professional tennis tournament played on green clay courts. It was the 19th edition of the tournament which was part of the 2018 ATP Challenger Tour. It took place in Tallahassee, Florida, United States between 23 and 28 April 2018.

Singles main-draw entrants

Seeds

 1 Rankings as of April 16, 2018.

Other entrants
The following players received wildcards into the singles main draw:
  JC Aragone
  Aziz Dougaz
  Jared Hiltzik
  Danny Thomas

The following player received entry into the singles main draw as a special exempt:
  Juan Ignacio Londero

The following players received entry from the qualifying draw:
  Trent Bryde
  Federico Coria
  Yoshihito Nishioka
  Max Purcell

The following player received entry as a lucky loser:
  João Pedro Sorgi

Champions

Singles

 Noah Rubin def.  Marc Polmans 6–2, 3–6, 6–4.

Doubles

 Robert Galloway /  Denis Kudla def.  Enrique López Pérez /  Jeevan Nedunchezhiyan 6–3, 6–1.

References

External links
Official Website

2018 ATP Challenger Tour
2018
2018 in American tennis
2018 in sports in Florida